is a Japanese cyclist. She competed in the women's cross-country mountain biking event at the 2000 Summer Olympics.

References

1968 births
Living people
Japanese female cyclists
Olympic cyclists of Japan
Cyclists at the 2000 Summer Olympics
Place of birth missing (living people)
Cyclists at the 2002 Asian Games
Asian Games competitors for Japan